Sangri may refer to the following :

 Sangri County, county in Tibet
 Sangri (village), village in Tibet
 Sangri State, a former princely state in Himachal Pradesh, India
 Prosopis cineraria, Sangri in Rajasthani language
 Temple of Sangri in Naxos, Greece